Cha Jong-bok (born 29 January 1980) is a South Korean field hockey player who competed in the 2008 and 2012 Summer Olympics.

References

External links

1980 births
Living people
South Korean male field hockey players
Olympic field hockey players of South Korea
Field hockey players at the 2008 Summer Olympics
Field hockey players at the 2012 Summer Olympics
Asian Games medalists in field hockey
Field hockey players at the 2006 Asian Games
Asian Games gold medalists for South Korea
Medalists at the 2006 Asian Games
20th-century South Korean people
21st-century South Korean people
2006 Men's Hockey World Cup players